John Jacob Wood (February 16, 1784 – May 20, 1874) was an American politician who served one term as a U.S. Representative from New York from 1829 to 1831.

Biography 
Born in Clarkstown, New York, Wood was its first town clerk, serving from 1809 to 1812.  He served as inspector of schools in 1815, 1823 from 1829 to 1831, and from 1835 to 1836.

Wood was a slave owner.

Congress 
Wood was elected to the 20th Congress (March 4, 1827 – March 3, 1829) as a Jacksonian. He returned to Rockland County after one term, where he served again as inspector of schools 1829-1831 and 1835 to 1837.  He was Surrogate of Rockland County in 1837.

He served as Rockland County delegate to the state constitutional convention in 1846.

Death 
Wood died in New City, New York on May 20, 1874, and was interred in Old Wood Burying Ground.

References

External links
1870 U.S. Census of Household of John J. Wood, Rockland County, New York from FamilySearch

1784 births
1874 deaths
Jacksonian members of the United States House of Representatives from New York (state)
People from Clarkstown, New York
People from New City, New York
19th-century American politicians
Members of the United States House of Representatives from New York (state)